Maria Teresa Veloso was a Mozambican civil servant and politician. In 1977 she was one of the first group of women elected to the People's Assembly.

Biography
An employee of the Ministry of Education, Veloso was a FRELIMO candidate in the 1977 parliamentary elections, in which she was one of the first group of 27 women elected to the People's Assembly. She later worked for the National Institute for the Development of Education.

References

Date of birth unknown
Mozambican civil servants
FRELIMO politicians
Members of the Assembly of the Republic (Mozambique)
20th-century Mozambican women politicians
20th-century Mozambican politicians
Possibly living people